Crossworlds is a 1996 science fiction film starring Rutger Hauer, Josh Charles, Andrea Roth, Stuart Wilson and Jack Black, and directed by Krishna Rao. Special effects are by Digital Drama. The film was shot in Los Angeles, Lone Pine, and El Mirage Dry Lake, California, USA.

Plot
College student Joe (Josh Charles) is drawn into a battle to save the world from arch-enemy Ferris (Stuart Wilson). Joe's heirloom pendant just happens to be the key to a sceptre that opens doors to the Crossworlds, another dimension. When Laura shows up to check on the key and Ferris' goons begin their assaults, they run to semi-retired adventurer A.T. (Rutger Hauer) for help and guidance.

Cast
 Rutger Hauer as Alex "A.T."
 Josh Charles as Joe "Seph" Talbot
 Stuart Wilson as Ferris
 Andrea Roth as Laura
 Perry Anzilotti as Rebo
 Richard McGregor as Stu
 Jack Black as Steve
 Ellen Geer as Joe's Mom
 Beverly Johnson as The Queen
 Tony Ervolina as Joe's Dad
 Michael Stadvec as Cop #1
 Michael Wiseman as Cop #2
 Shani Rigsbee as The Dancer

Review

Creature Feature gave the movie 2 out of 5 stars, finding the low budget a detriment

References

External links
 
 

1990s science fiction action films
1996 fantasy films
Paranormal films
American science fiction action films
Films about parallel universes
Space adventure films
1996 films
1996 directorial debut films
1990s English-language films
1990s American films